HD 149989 is a single, variable star in the southern constellation of Ara, located near the western constellation border with Norma. It has the variable star designation V872 Arae, while HD 149989 is the identifier from the Henry Draper Catalogue. This is a dim star near the lower limit of visibility to the naked eye with an apparent visual magnitude that fluctuates around 6.30. It is located at a distance of 167 light years from the Sun based on parallax, and is drifting further away with a radial velocity of 46 km/s.

This is a confirmed variable star of the Gamma Doradus type with a period of 0.42658 days. It is around 1.1 billion years old and is spinning with a projected rotational velocity of 136 km/s.

References

External links
 HIP 81650
 Image HD 149989

A-type main-sequence stars
Gamma Doradus variables
Ara (constellation)
CD-51 10403
149989
081650
Arae, V872